The Servais Ministry was in office in Luxembourg from 3 December 1867 to 26 December 1874. It was reshuffled four times.

Composition

3 December 1867 to 30 September 1869
 Emmanuel Servais: Minister of State, head of government, Director-General for Foreign Affairs
 Édouard Thilges: Director-General for Communal Affaires
 Henri Vannerus: Director-General for Justice
 Jean Colnet d'Huart: Director-General for Finance

30 September 1869 to 12 October 1869
 Emmanuel Servais: Minister of State, head of government, Director-General for Foreign Affairs, provisionally also for Finances
 Édouard Thilges: Director-General for Communal Affaires
 Henri Vannerus: Director-General for Justice

12 October 1869 to 7 February 1870
 Emmanuel Servais: Minister of State, head of government, Director-General for Foreign Affairs
 Édouard Thilges: Director-General for Communal Affaires
 Henri Vannerus: Director-General for Justice
 Georges Ulveling: Director-General for Finance

7 February 1870 to 25 May 1873
 Emmanuel Servais: Minister of State, head of government, Director-General for Foreign Affairs
 Henri Vannerus: Director-General for Justice
 Georges Ulveling: Director-General for Finance
 Nicolas Salentiny: Director-General for the Interior

25 May 1873 to 26 December 1874
 Emmanuel Servais: Minister of State, head of government, Director-General for Foreign Affairs
 Henri Vannerus: Director-General for Justice
 Nicolas Salentiny: Director-General for the Interior
 Victor de Roebe: Director-General for Finance

Foreign policy
The Treaty of London of 1867 required Luxembourg to demolish its fortress, and declared it a neutral state. This was a solution to the Luxembourg Crisis, which had almost led to war between France and Prussia.

The Servais government had to carry out the stipulations of the treaty, and bear its costs. Demolishing the fortifications took until 1883, and cost 1,798,000 francs. The sale of the land to private individuals only covered part of the costs, and this was a massive drain on the state's budget. A government commission planned the expansion of the city now that it was no longer constrained by the fortress, with new avenues and boulevards and a green belt of parks.

The law of 1868 created a Luxembourgish corps des chasseurs, to maintain security and order. It was composed of 19 officers and 587 non-commissioned officers and men

Compliance with the Treaty obligations did not shelter Luxembourg from another international crisis. In 1870, the Franco-Prussian War broke out, and several incidents threatened the country's neutrality. The population was openly on the side of the French, and the employees of the Compagnie de l'Est supplied the Thionville garrison via a train departing from Luxembourg. Though this was not approved by the government, Prussian chancellor Otto von Bismarck let it be known that the Prussian military would no longer feel bound by the Grand Duchy's neutral status. Another foreign occupation seemed imminent, and Servais vigorously refuted the Prussian allegations. In the end, after the French defeat, the newly created German Empire contented itself with control of the Luxembourgish railways. The French railways were forced to cede control of the Luxembourg railway network to the Germans. The Luxembourgish government had not been asked, and was opposed to this.

Domestic policy 
The dissolution of the German Confederation after the Austro-Prussian war of 1866 allowed the Servais government in Luxembourg to turn its back on the German political model that had been imposed by the coup d'état of 1856, and to undertake a revision of the constitution. The resulting constitution of 1868 was a compromise between the republican text of 1848, and the monarchist charter of 1856. Ministerial responsibility and the annual vote on taxes were re-introduced. The Constitution guaranteed basic civil liberties such as freedom of the press and freedom of association again. At the same time, the sovereign retained several important prerogatives. After 1848, the government and the legislature had often locked horns over constitutional questions: the constitution of 1868 re-established a certain equilibrium between these two institutions. 

Since the Grand-Duchy of Luxembourg had been made an Apostolic Vicariate in 1840, the need had been growing for a redefinition of the relations between church and state. The civil authorities felt snubbed when in 1870 Rome took the initiative of creating a diocese and appointing Nicolas Adames as the first Bishop of Luxembourg. On the advice of the Council of State, the government first refused to recognise the Vatican's decision. In 1872, finally, it submitted a bill to legally establish the bishopric. The law, which was approved on 30 April 1873, stipulated that the bishopric could only be occupied by a Luxembourger, and the bishop had to swear an oath of loyalty to the monarch.

Economic policy 
The Servais government's time in office saw the beginnings of the modern steel industry in Luxembourg. The two last blast furnaces using charcoal, relicts of the pre-industrial era, were shut in 1868. New furnaces were established in Dommeldange and the mining area. The production of cast iron doubled in 4 years, rising from 93,000 tons in 1868 to 185,000 in 1872. Extraction of iron increased from 722,000 tons to 1 million tons in 1871. However, only a third of the iron ore that was mined was processed in the country, the rest being exported to Germany and Belgium. The Servais government's policy aimed to reverse this, and to divert resources towards the industrialisation of the country. 

The mining law of 15 March 1870 declared all mineral deposits to a certain depth underground to be property of the state, and therefore subject to mining concessions. Another law in 1874 regulated the manner of these concessions, which were to become a major source of revenue for public finances. The price of concessions was to be paid in annuities staggered over many years, which allowed small Luxembourgish businesses with a small amount of capital to acquire concessions. The government had also intended to introduce a clause requiring the extracted iron ore to be processed in the country (the Verhüttungsklausel). However, this measure was strongly opposed by Germany, as it was contrary to the principles of the Zollverein, and in the end it was dropped. Nevertheless, through the laws of 1870 and 1874, the government had given itself a powerful instrument to steer the industrialisation of the country.

References 

Ministries of Luxembourg
History of Luxembourg (1815–1890)